The Hassayampa Inn, long known as the Hassayampa Hotel, in Prescott, Arizona, is a landmark on Gurley Street which was built in 1927.  It was designed by architects Trost & Trost.

Its architecture is Mission/Spanish Revival and/or Italian Renaissance Revival.

It is listed on the National Register of Historic Places in 1979.

It is a member of the National Registry of the Historic Hotels of America.

It was built by the Ramey Bros., construction contractors of El Paso, Texas.

References

External links
 
 

Hotels in Arizona
Prescott, Arizona
National Register of Historic Places in Prescott, Arizona
Buildings and structures completed in 1927
Historic Hotels of America